Brigadier General Theodore Alfred Bingham (May 14, 1858 – September 6, 1934)  was the New York City police commissioner from 1906 to 1909.

Biography
Theodore A. Bingham was born at Andover, Connecticut on May 14, 1858 to Joel Foote Bingham, a clergyman, and Susan G. Bingham. He married Lucile Rutherford of St. Louis, who died in 1920. In 1926, he was married in London to Addison Mitchell of New York. She died a year later. Bingham died at his summer home in Chester, Nova Scotia on September 7, 1934, aged 76. He was buried in Chester according to his wishes. 

Bingham graduated from West Point Military Academy in 1879, receiving a commission as second lieutenant. Between 1879 and 1890, he served in various capacities as an engineering officer and as a military attaché in Berlin and Rome. He served as superintendent of the public buildings and grounds at Washington from 1897 to 1901 with the rank of colonel. He was transferred to Buffalo, New York on an engineering assignment where he suffered an accident which caused the loss of a leg, forcing his retirement from active service in the army in 1904 at the rank of brigadier general. 

He served as police commissioner of New York City from January 1, 1906 to July 1, 1909.

Controversial actions
In 1907, while serving as police commissioner of New York City, he arranged with Immigration Commissioner Robert Watchorn to allow local New York detectives to search newly-arriving immigrants, who he publicly blamed for a “crime wave”.

These anti-immigrant policies received wider attention when he published an article in North American Review on "Foreign Criminals" in which he asserted that half the criminals in the city were Jews. In the controversy that followed, he issued a statement denying any malice or prejudice, instead blaming incorrect statistics that “were not compiled by myself, but were furnished me by others”.

Later life
Bingham was removed from his role as police commissioner on July 2, 1909 by Mayor McClellan after he refused to remove photos of individuals not convicted of any crime from his ‘Rogues Gallery’, in defiance of a New York Supreme Court ruling [Gow vs. Bingham]. Bingham, defending his refusal, wrote “the police report to me that Duffy [George B. Duffy, 19 y.o.] is a very disorderly person, with a bad reputation, and that some of his associates are degenerates.”
In 1908 he was elected as a hereditary member of the Connecticut Society of the Cincinnati.  In 1911, he served for a few months as chief engineer of the Department of Highways, and from 1911 to 1915, he was a consulting engineer with the Department of Bridges. In 1917, he was recalled to active service in the army in command of the Second Engineering District, New York City. He was discharged from active service and returned to retirement on June 10, 1919.

Dates of rank
Cadet - 1 September 1875
2nd Lieutenant - 13 June 1879
1st Lieutenant - 17 June 1881
Captain - 2 July 1889
Major - 5 July 1898
Colonel (temporary) - 9 March 1897 to 30 April 1903
Brigadier General - 11 July 1904
Retired - 12 July 1904

References

External links
 

1858 births
1934 deaths
American amputees
New York City Police Commissioners
People from Tolland County, Connecticut
United States Army generals
United States Military Academy alumni